The Streets of London is a 1929 British silent crime film directed by Norman Lee and starring David Dunbar, Wera Engels and Jack Rutherford. It was adapted from Dion Boucicault's play of the same title and was made at Isleworth Studios.

Plot
A man embezzles the fortune of a dead captain's daughter.

Cast
 David Dunbar as Gideon Bloodgood 
 Wera Engels as Alida 
 Jack Rutherford as Mark Livingstone 
 Charles Lincoln as Inspector Benson 
 Beatrice Duffy as Lucy 
 Janice Adair as Girl

References

Bibliography
 Low, Rachel. The History of British Film: Volume IV, 1918–1929. Routledge, 1997.
 Wood, Linda. British Films, 1927-1939. British Film Institute, 1986.

External links

1929 films
British crime films
Films directed by Norman Lee
1929 crime films
British silent feature films
Films set in London
Films shot at Isleworth Studios
British black-and-white films
1920s British films